Sur Chah-e Pain (also Romanized as Sūr Chāh-e Pā’īn; also known as Soorchah, Sorchat, Sūr Chāh, and Sūrchāt) is a village in Surak Rural District, Lirdaf District, Jask County, Hormozgan Province, Iran. At the 2006 census, its population was 226, in 54 families.

References 

Populated places in Jask County